The Cryptolechiinae are a subfamily of small moths in the family Depressariidae.

Taxonomy and systematics
Acryptolechia Lvovsky, 2010
Cryptolechia Zeller, 1852
Orophia Hübner, [1825]
Cacochroa Heinemann, 1870

References

 
Depressariidae
Moth subfamilies